The Reignwood LPGA Classic was a women's professional golf tournament in China on the LPGA Tour.

Shanshan Feng won the inaugural event with an eagle on the final hole to win by a stroke over runner-up Stacy Lewis.

In 2017, the tournament name changed to Alisports LPGA before being canceled.

Winners

Tournament records

References

External links
Coverage on LPGA Tour's official site
Nicklaus.com: Pine Valley Golf Club
Beijing Golf Courses: Pine Valley Golf Resort and Country Club 

Former LPGA Tour events
Golf tournaments in China
Changping District
Recurring sporting events established in 2013
Recurring sporting events disestablished in 2017
2013 establishments in China
2017 disestablishments in China
Women's sport in China